The Harmony Plantation, also known as Montague-Jones Farm, is a historic plantation house located at 5104 Riley Hill Road near Wendell, North Carolina, a town in eastern Wake County. It was built in 1833, and is a two-story, three bay, single-pile, Greek Revival style frame dwelling.  It is sheathed in weatherboard, has a hipped roof, and a gabled rear ell. The front facade features a centered, double-tier pedimented, front-gabled portico with bracketed cornice and unfluted Doric order columns. Also on the property is a contributing one-story, rectangular, beaded weatherboard building that once housed a doctor's office (1833).

The plantation was the home of Dr. Henry W. Montague, his wife Anne Jones Montague and as many as 46 people who they enslaved people and forced to work the farm.

In January 2008, the Harmony Plantation was listed on the National Register of Historic Places.

See also
 List of Registered Historic Places in North Carolina

References

Plantation houses in North Carolina
Houses on the National Register of Historic Places in North Carolina
Houses completed in 1833
Greek Revival houses in North Carolina
Houses in Wake County, North Carolina
National Register of Historic Places in Wake County, North Carolina